Wilbraham Egerton, 1st Earl Egerton (17 January 1832 – 16 March 1909) was an English Conservative Party politician from the Egerton family. He sat in the House of Commons from 1858 to 1883 when he inherited his peerage and was elevated to the House of Lords.

Life
Egerton was the son of the 1st Baron Egerton and his wife Lady Charlotte Loftus eldest daughter of the Marquis of Ely. He was educated at Eton College and Christ Church, Oxford. He was a Justice of the Peace for Cheshire and a captain in the Earl of Chester's Yeomanry Cavalry.

In 1858 Egerton was elected Member of Parliament for North Cheshire and held the seat until it was reorganised in 1868. He was then elected MP for Mid Cheshire and held the seat until 1883, when he succeeded his father as 2nd Baron Egerton. He was the second Chairman of the Manchester Ship Canal from 1887 to 1894. In 1897, he was created Earl Egerton.

Egerton was appointed Lieutenant and Custos Rotulorum (Lord Lieutenant) of Cheshire in March 1900, serving until 1905.

Egerton was chairman of the Church Defence Institution, and an Ecclesiastical Commissioner. He died on 16 March 1909 at the age of 77. A bust of Egerton by Kathleen Shaw is on display at Tatton Park.

Family
Egerton married on 15 October 1857 Lady Mary Amherst, the only daughter of the 2nd Earl Amherst.  They had one child, Lady Gertrude Lucia Egerton, who later married the future 8th Earl of Albemarle. His first wife died in 1892 and on 8 August 1894, Lord Egerton married Alice Temple-Nugent-Brydges-Chandos-Grenville, the widow of the 3rd Duke of Buckingham and Chandos.

References

External links 

1832 births
1909 deaths
Earls in the Peerage of the United Kingdom
Lord-Lieutenants of Cheshire
Members of the Parliament of the United Kingdom for English constituencies
UK MPs 1857–1859
UK MPs 1859–1865
UK MPs 1865–1868
UK MPs 1868–1874
UK MPs 1874–1880
UK MPs 1880–1885
UK MPs who inherited peerages
UK MPs who were granted peerages
Wilbraham
Eldest sons of British hereditary barons
People educated at Eton College
Alumni of Christ Church, Oxford
Peers of the United Kingdom created by Queen Victoria
Hulme Trust
Lancashire and Cheshire Antiquarian Society
Tatton family